Marlette Jr./Sr. High School is a high school located in Marlette, Michigan.  It is a Class C School District. The current building has been used as the high school since its construction in 1967. The building is also currently being used as the middle school as well as the high school.

References

Public high schools in Michigan
Educational institutions established in 1967
Schools in Sanilac County, Michigan
Public middle schools in Michigan
1967 establishments in Michigan